The Irish League in season 1950–51 comprised 12 teams, and Glentoran won the championship.

League standings

Results

References
Northern Ireland - List of final tables (RSSSF)

NIFL Premiership seasons
1950–51 in Northern Ireland association football
North